Omar Abdul-Kafi (his full name is Omar Abdelkafy Shahata)(May 1, 1951).He was born in the Egyptian province which is called Almania among a conservative family. Also, he is an Egyptian writer and lecturer.

He has a YouTube channel with over than 7.7 million subscribers.

Books
He wrote dozens of books in Arabic, such as:
 The True Promise, .
 Mind Your Tongue, .
 Urgent Messages to My Muslim Daughter, .
 Sins of the Tongue, .
 The Doors of Goodness, .
 This Is Our Religion, .
 The Ethics of Muslim Man and Woman, .
 “The Hereafter” 

On TV
He made hundreds of lectures on different TV channels, such as Iqraa TV & Al-Resalah TV.

He had lots of lessons and lectures, for example: “From The Treasures of Sunnah” (in Arabic: كنوز السنة ),

"The Real Promise" (in Arabic: الوعد الحقّ), “The Lucifer Diaries” (in Arabic:مذكرات إبليس), and “Wonders Heart” (in Arabic: عجائب القلوب).

See also

 Mohammed Rateb al-Nabulsi
 Abdul Majeed al-Zindani
 Zaghloul El-Naggar
 Qur'an and science
 I'jaz In Islam.
 Islam in Egypt.

References

1951 births
Living people
Islamic miracles
People from Minya Governorate
Egyptian agriculturalists
Egyptian biologists
Egyptian scientists
Egyptian Sunni Muslim scholars of Islam
Egyptian writers